Nels Christian Nelson (April 9, 1875 – March 5, 1964) was a Danish-American archaeologist.

Biography
Nelson was born near Fredericia, in the Fredericia municipality in the eastern part of Jutland, Denmark. He was  the eldest child in a poor family. He was sent to work on an uncle's farm in Minnesota in 1892. There he started first grade at age 17, graduating from high school in 1901. He rode a cattle car to California, saved money from odd jobs, and entered Stanford University in about 1903. He transferred to the University of California, Berkeley in 1905. Nelson earned his Bachelor of Letters in 1907, and an M.L. in 1908.

Nelson  became interested in anthropology, and went to work for John C. Merriam surveying middens around San Francisco Bay and on the California coast. Nelson later estimated he walked 3,000 miles for the survey. In 1911, Nelson accepted a job with the American Museum of Natural History to do an archaeological survey of the upper Rio Grande valley of New Mexico. His new wife, Ethelyn Hobbs Nelson, would be his paid field assistant. Nelson excavated a number of Pueblo ruins in the Galisteo Basin, many of which were abandoned following the Pueblo Revolt of 1680. He also did some excavation at Chaco Canyon with Earl Morris.

Nelson pioneered the technique of stratigraphic excavation in America. During his work in the Galisteo Basin, he dug a series of 1-foot levels in trash mounds at archeological sites, classified all the pot shards he found  into seven types, and calculated their frequencies by levels. These resembled sections of normal distribution curves, and demonstrated that statistical analysis of data from arbitrary levels could reveal chronological change just as could data from physically distinct strata. This technique, refined by Alfred V. Kidder at Pecos, continues to be used to the present day.

The Daxi culture, a Neolithic culture,  located in the Qutang Gorge around Wushan, Chongqing, in China was discovered by Nels C. Nelson in the 1920s. The Nelsons joined Roy Chapman Andrews on his third expedition to Mongolia in 1925.

Nelson served as president of the American Anthropological Association, president of the Society for American Archaeology, president of the American Ethnological Society, and vice president of the American Association for the Advancement of Science. Nelson served in a number of curatorial positions at American Museum of Natural History (AMNH), ultimately as Curator of Prehistoric Archeology. He retired from AMNH in 1943, and died in 1964 in New York City, at age 89.

Notable publications
 Shellmounds of the San Francisco Bay Region  (University of California publications in American Archaeology and Ethnology. v. 7, no. 4. Berkeley: University Press. 1909)
Pueblo ruins of the Galisteo basin, New Mexico (Anthropological papers of the American museum of Natural History. Vol. XV, pt. I. The Trustees. 1914)
 Chronology of the Tano Ruins, New Mexico (American Anthropologist, vol. 18, No. 2, pp. 159–180. 1916)
Flint Working By Ishi (Holmes Anniversary Volume. Anthropological Essays Presented to Wm. Henry Holmes. Washington D.C.:397–402. 1916)
 Contributions to the Archaeology of Mammoth Cave and Vicinity, Kentucky (Anthropological papers of the American Museum of Natural History. vol. 22, pt. 1. 1917)
 The New Conquest of Central Asia; A Narrative of the Explorations of the Central Asiatic Expeditions in Mongolia and China, 1921–1930 (with Roy Chapman Andrews,  Walter W. Granger and Clifford H. Pope. New York: The American Museum of Natural History. 1932)
The antiquity of man in America in the light of archaeology (University of Toronto Press. 1933)
Notes on the Santa Barbara culture (Essays in anthropology in honor of Alfred Louis Kroeber  pp. 199–209. Univ. of California Press. 1936)
South African rock pictures (American Museum of Natural History. 1937)

References

External links
Archaeology and the Public in the Galisteo Basin
Nelson's stratigraphic work in the Galisteo Basin
Anthropological Association
Society for American Archaeology

American archaeologists
Archaeologists of California
American curators
1875 births
1964 deaths
Danish emigrants to the United States
University of California, Berkeley alumni
People associated with the American Museum of Natural History
People from Fredericia